Takurō Matsui (松井 太久郎; Fukuoka Prefecture, 3 December 1887 – 10 June 1969) was a Lieutenant General in the Imperial Japanese Army in World War II.

Matsui commanded the Western District Army between 15 July 1938 and 9 March 1940.

He received command of the 5th Japanese Division on 15 October 1940, which fought at that time in China in the Second Sino-Japanese War. On 8 December 1941, his division landed on the beaches of Southern Thailand and fought with success in the Malayan Campaign and the following Battle of Singapore. 

On 11 May 1942, he was replaced at the head of the division by Lieutenant General Yamamoto Tsutomi.

On 18 March 1943 he became Chief of Staff of the China Expeditionary Army, a post he would hold until 1 February 1945, when he became commander until the end of the War of the Thirteenth Army, posted in the lower Yangtze River area of east central China.

References

Sources 
 Rottman, Gordon L. Japanese Army in World War II 1941–42, Osprey Publishing, 2005, 
 Yenne, Bill. The Imperial Japanese Army: The Invincible Years 1941–4, Osprey Publishing, 2014, 

1887 births
1969 deaths
Japanese generals
Japanese military personnel of World War II